Ibn Makhlad can refer to:

 al-Hasan ibn Makhlad al-Jarrah (died 882), Abbasid vizier
 Sa'id ibn Makhlad (died 889), Abbasid vizier
 Sulayman ibn al-Hasan ibn Makhlad (fl. 930–940), Abbasid vizier